The 2016 IIHF World Championship Division I was an international ice hockey tournament run by the International Ice Hockey Federation. Group A was contested in Katowice, Poland, on 23–29 April 2016 and Group B in Zagreb, Croatia, on 17–23 April 2016.

Venues

Group A tournament

Participants

Match officials
7 referees and 7 linesmen were selected for the tournament.

Referees
 Jonathan Alarie
 Mikko Kaukokari
 Artur Kulev
 Trpimir Piragić
 Stephen Reneau
 Marian Rohatsch
 Robin Šír

Linesmen
 Henrik Haurum
 Artur Hyliński
 Martin Korba
 Kriss Kupcus
 Joep Leermakers
 Yakov Paley
 Anton Semjonov

Standings

Results
All times are local (UTC+2).

Awards and statistics

Awards
Best players selected by the directorate:
 Best Goalkeeper:  Bernhard Starkbaum
 Best Defenseman:  Thomas Larkin
 Best Forward:  Patryk Wronka
Source: IIHF.com

Media All-Stars:
 MVP:  Jan Urbas
 Goalkeeper:  Gašper Krošelj
 Defenceman:  Sabahudin Kovačević /  Paweł Dronia
 Forwards:  Michael Swift /  Jan Urbas /  Patryk Wronka
Source: IIHF.com

Scoring leaders
List shows the top skaters sorted by points, then goals.

GP = Games played; G = Goals; A = Assists; Pts = Points; +/− = Plus/minus; PIM = Penalties in minutes
Source: IIHF.com

Goaltending leaders
Only the top five goaltenders, based on save percentage, who have played at least 40% of their team's minutes, are included in this list.

TOI = Time on ice (minutes:seconds); SA = Shots against; GA = Goals against; GAA = Goals against average; Sv% = Save percentage; SO = Shutouts
Source: IIHF.com

Group B tournament

Participants

Match officials
4 referees and 7 linesmen were selected for the tournament.

Referees
 Jimmy Bergamelli
 Daniel Gamper
 Mikael Holm
 Manuel Nikolic

Linesmen
 Vanja Belić
 Franco Espinoza
 Tomislav Grozaj
 Markus Hägerström
 Shunsuke Ichikawa
 Park Jun-soo
 Damir Rakovič

Standings

Results
All times are local (UTC+2).

Awards and statistics

Awards
Best players selected by the directorate:
Best Goalkeeper:  Eduard Zakharchenko
Best Defenseman:  Ben O'Connor
Best Forward:  Borna Rendulić
Source: IIHF.com

Scoring leaders
List shows the top skaters sorted by points, then goals.

GP = Games played; G = Goals; A = Assists; Pts = Points; +/− = Plus/minus; PIM = Penalties in minutes; POS = Position
Source: IIHF.com

Goaltending leaders
Only the top five goaltenders, based on save percentage, who have played at least 40% of their team's minutes, are included in this list.

TOI = Time on ice (minutes:seconds); SA = Shots against; GA = Goals against; GAA = Goals against average; Sv% = Save percentage; SO = Shutouts
Source: IIHF.com

References

2016
Division I
2016 IIHF World Championship Division I
2016 IIHF World Championship Division I
2016 IIHF World Championship Division I
2016 IIHF World Championship Division I
April 2016 sports events in Europe
2010s in Zagreb
21st century in Katowice
World
World